Sodium thiocyanate (sometimes called sodium sulphocyanide) is the chemical compound with the formula NaSCN.  This colorless deliquescent salt is one of the main sources of the thiocyanate anion.  As such, it is used as a precursor for the synthesis of pharmaceuticals and other specialty chemicals.  Thiocyanate salts are typically prepared by the reaction of cyanide with elemental sulfur:

8 NaCN  +  S8  →  8 NaSCN

Sodium thiocyanate crystallizes in an orthorhombic cell.  Each Na+ center is surrounded by three sulfur and three nitrogen ligands provided by the triatomic thiocyanate anion. It is commonly used in the laboratory as a test for the presence of Fe3+ ions.

Applications in chemical synthesis
Sodium thiocyanate is employed to convert alkyl halides into the corresponding alkylthiocyanates.  Closely related reagents include ammonium thiocyanate and potassium thiocyanate, which has twice the solubility in water. Silver thiocyanate may be used as well; the precipitation of insoluble silver halides help simplify workup. Treatment of isopropyl bromide with sodium thiocyanate in a hot ethanolic solution affords isopropyl thiocyanate. Protonation of sodium thiocyanate affords isothiocyanic acid, S=C=NH (pKa = −1.28).  This species is generated in situ from sodium thiocyanate; it adds to organic amines to afford derivatives of thiourea.

References

Sodium compounds
Thiocyanates